The Revithoussa LNG Terminal is the only LNG terminal in Greece. It is located on the islet of Revithoussa (or Revithousa, or Revythousa), in the Gulf of Megara, west of Athens. It was completed in 1999 and is operated by DESFA SA, which is a fully owned subsidiary of DEPA. The gas is supplied under contract from Algeria's Sonatrach, of between 0.51 and 0.68 billion cubic meters annually until 2021. There is also a contract with Italy's Eni to supply gas, though not currently used.

Capacity 
In 2007, an expansion project was completed to upgrade the terminal, increasing its capacity to 185 Bcf/y (5.2-5.3 billion cubic meters annually). The LNG is stored in two in-ground tanks, with a total capacity of 130,000 cubic meters. A third storage tank and electricity power plant are planned.

See also 

 List of LNG terminals
 Energy in Greece

References

External links 
Google Maps

Energy infrastructure in Greece
Liquefied natural gas terminals
Natural gas in Greece